James Ernest Morton is a Canadian politician, who was elected to the Nova Scotia House of Assembly in the 2009 provincial election. He represented the electoral district of Kings North, as a member of the New Democratic Party, until his defeat in the 2013 election.

Born in Kentville, Nova Scotia in 1951, Morton grew up on a family farm in Somerset. He was educated at Acadia University and Dalhousie University, becoming a social worker. At the time of his election to the legislature, he was the manager of the addiction services program at Annapolis Valley Health in Kentville. In March 2016, Morton was named chief of staff for NDP leader Gary Burrill.

References

Living people
Nova Scotia New Democratic Party MLAs
People from Kentville, Nova Scotia
1951 births
Canadian social workers
21st-century Canadian politicians